Algernon Wilkinson (21 January 1894 – 1967) was an English professional footballer who played as a goalkeeper.

Career
Born in Greasbrough, Wilkinson signed for Bradford City from Rotherham County in May 1919. He made 12 league and 5 FA Cup appearances for the club, before joining Liverpool in January 1923. He later played for Blackpool, Mold Town, Wrexham, Flint Town and Little Sutton Victoria.

Sources

References

1894 births
1967 deaths
Date of death missing
English footballers
Rotherham County F.C. players
Bradford City A.F.C. players
Liverpool F.C. players
Blackpool F.C. players
Wrexham A.F.C. players
Flint Town United F.C. players
English Football League players
Association football goalkeepers